Cattan may refer to:

 Saint Cathan, 6th century Irish monk in Scotland
 Christopher Cattan (fl. 16th century), Italian author
 Henry Cattan (1906–1992), Palestinian jurist
 Olivia Cattan (born 1967), French writer and activist
 Ziyad Cattan, businessman accused of massive fraud in US-occupied Iraq

See also
 Ebrahim Al-Cattan (born 1963), Kuwaiti fencer
 Catan, a board game